Burnsville is an unincorporated community in Rock Creek Township, Bartholomew County, in the U.S. state of Indiana.

History
Burnsville was founded in 1845. It was named for its founder, Brice Burns. Burnsville had a post office between 1852 and 1903.

Geography

References

Unincorporated communities in Bartholomew County, Indiana
Unincorporated communities in Indiana